The Wood Awards (until 2003 the Carpenters' Award)  is a British award for working with wood. The award, which was launched in 1971, is bestowed on winners of several categories within buildings and furniture. Awards are presented in The Carpenters Hall following the decision of the architects, engineers, furniture designers / makers, timber specialists and architectural journalists who judge the competition. The Awards are sponsored by several commercial organisations and the Worshipful Company of Carpenters. 

Each year there is one winner and one "Highly Commended" project in seven categories, and a "Gold Award" for the best of the seven category winners.

Winners
A list of winners and highly commended projects, 2008-, is available online.

Gold Award winners, 2008- 
2008:New Shetland Museum & Archives, new building 
2009:Kings Place Concert Hall, concert hall within larger new development 
2010:Stoke Newington Town Hall, restoration of 1930s building 
2011:Brockholes Visitor Centre, creation of new floating building on nature reserve

References

External links

Awards established in 1971
British awards
Design awards
Wood